The Great Synagogue was a historic Jewish synagogue in Łomża, Poland. The synagogue stood at the southeastern corner of the Main Square, at the intersection of today's Giełczyńska and Senatorska streets.

It was built from 1878 to 1889 on the initiative of Rabbi Eliezer-Simcha Rabinowicz, and it was designed by Italian-Polish architect Enrico Marconi from Congress Poland.

From 1918 to 1922, the synagogue's chief cantor was Isaac Hirshow.

Destruction
The Great Synagogue was destroyed by the invading Germans either in September 1939, at the very beginning of World War II (according to Polish online Virtual Shtetl), or in September 1941 (according to Pinkas haKehilot), soon after the German attack on the Soviet Union and the creation of the Łomża Ghetto for the Jews from surrounding villages and towns. Most likely the Great Synagogue was destroyed in stages, first burned down, and leveled out later.

At present, only a memorial plaque marks the site of the former synagogue, with an inscription in Polish and Hebrew, which reads:
From July 1941 to November 1942 in the streets: Dworna – now 22-go Lipca, Senatorska, Woziwodzka, Zielona, Żydowska – now Zatylna, and Rybaki, the Nazis set up a ghetto, where they exterminated 9,000 Poles of Jewish ethnicity. 3,500 of them were shot in the woods near the villages of Giełczyn and Sławiec. The German occupiers established 15 ghettos in the towns of Łomża region. The tragic fate of around 40,000 people living in them led to the extermination camp in Treblinka. May the memory of them and of those who were helping them in those terrible days last.

Notes and references

 

Former synagogues in Poland
Synagogues in Poland destroyed by Nazi Germany
Buildings and structures in Łomża
Synagogues completed in 1889
19th-century religious buildings and structures in Poland